Davilanthus is a genus of flowering plants belonging to the family Asteraceae.

Its native range is Mexico.

Species:

Davilanthus davilae 
Davilanthus hidalgoanus 
Davilanthus huajuapanus 
Davilanthus hypargyreus 
Davilanthus purpusii 
Davilanthus sericeus 
Davilanthus veracruzanus

References

Heliantheae
Asteraceae genera